The Student Experimental Film Festival in Binghamton, also known as SEFF Binghamton, is an annual film festival in Binghamton, NY. The film festival features short experimental films made by students from around the country. The film festival is organized and curated by Binghamton University students enrolled in Curating Film and Video, an undergraduate course offered by the Cinema department.



History
SEFF Binghamton is one of several projects that Binghamton University's Cinema department organizes to celebrate its experimental roots. The Cinema department was founded by  Ken Jacobs and Larry Gottheim in 1969-70 and has been made up of many notable filmmakers and scholars over the years, such as Steve Anker, Stephanie Barber, Alan Berliner, Gregg Biermann, Daniel Eisenberg, Ariana Gerstein, Richard Herskowitz, J. Hoberman, Bill T. Jones, Mark LaPore, Mark McElhatten, Ken Ross, Rene Shafransky, Phil Solomon, Art Spiegelman, Phil Weisman, and Adam Zucker. The students in the Cinema Department at Binghamton University also organizes an end-of-the-semester Student Film Show, and students in BU Film Salon, a student club, present screening programs of experimental films throughout the semester. The Cinema Department also conducts a Visiting Film/Video Artists' Speakers' Series, inviting established and emerging film and video artists.

Mission Statement
The Student Experimental Film Festival in Binghamton is a student-run film festival dedicated to exhibiting innovative student-made short films completed within the last academic year from across the country. SEFF Binghamton focuses on experimental works that challenge the conventional cinematic experiences, and strive to create a way for the student and local communities to bond and enjoy themselves while being taken to another dimension. The films you will view will create the most memorable and life-changing experience that you will never forget. With the help and guidance of Professor Tomonari Nishikawa, students enrolled in the Curating Film and Video course at Binghamton University have organized and programmed this two-day festival for your viewing pleasure.

2022 SEFF Binghamton 
13th annual SEFF Binghamton was held at The Bundy Museum of History and Art on 129 Main St, Binghamton on December 3rd 2022. Programs were curated by students enrolled in CINE300 - Curating Film and Video at Binghamton University. The award for best experimental film (ex aequo) went to Lone Star State by Sarah Soucek and Armatures by Anisa Hodzic.

"Transmundane"

Total Running Time: 54:32

 Factory Farmed (Derek Thomas Cestone, 5 min, video, Penn State)
 P[]P C()RN (Jonathan Riles, 1 min, video, Columbus College of Art & Design)
 Hello World (Jude Silvertree, 5 min, video, School of the Art Institute of Chicago)
 Beyond the Broken Bottle (Nicole Tucker, 3.5 min, video, Pratt Institute)
 South i-95 (Lindsey Arturo, 1.5 min, video, Virginia Commonwealth University)
 16 One (Holden Treadway, 2 min, 16mm on video, University of North Carolina Wilmington)
 swam (Cathy Teng, 2.5 min, video animation, Princeton University)
 Saltwater (Declan McKenna, 7.5 min, video animation, Maryland Institute College of Art)
 30/900 (Shirin Maleki, 9 min, video, Duke University)
 Order of the Army of the Arts (Kamila Abdygapparova, 1.5 min, video animation, San Francisco State University)
 A Letter with My Sword, Word by Word (Emma Barany, 3 min, video animation, Maryland Institute College of Art)
 LISTEN (Casey Schaffer, 3.5 min, video, DeSales University)
 One Last Time (Adam J Santiago, 2.5 min, video animation, Virginia Commonwealth University)
 semicolon (Kate Kitchin, 1 min, video animation, Binghamton University)

"The Human Experience" 

Total Running Time: 63:09

 Lone Star State (Sarah Soucek, 9 min, video animation, Bard College)
 Armatures (Anisa Hodzic, 7 min, 8mm/16mm/35mm on video, SUNY Purchase)
 Ultraviolet (Rachel Schofield, 3 min, video, Massachusetts College of Art and Design)
 Triangle (Fanxi Sun, 10 min, video, Virginia Commonwealth University)
 White Noise (Ren Evans, 3.5 min, video, Massachusetts College of Art and Design)
 CAUGHT THE BUG (Amelia Wyeth Ponirakis, 6 min, super8 on video, SUNY Purchase)
 Persistence of Memory (Niyah Ahmad, 7 min, video, Virginia Commonwealth University)
 Still Genesis (Chris Golub, 5.5 min, video, Binghamton University)
 Chorna (Zagham A Shah, 5 min, video, Binghamton University)
 Eastern Standard Time/Eastern Daylight Time (Juan Luis Velazquez, 7 min, 16mm and digital video, Duke University)

2021 SEFF Binghamton 
2021 SEFF Binghamton was held on campus on November 19, 2021. The program was curated and organized by students in BU Film Salon.

"Seasonal Creation"

Total Running Time: 59 min.

 Dancin' in Pixels (Michaela Thomas, Franklin and Marshall College)

 Non-fungible (Sari Applefeld, Ohio State University)

 Mist, Mountain, and Drum (Emma Chang, University of Wisconsin-Milwaukee)

 Frozen Out (Hao Zhou, University of Iowa)

 完美藍 (Perfect Blue) (Valentine Xue, Franklin and Marshall College)

 Staring Contest (Grace Walker, Amherst College)

 Ceremony or Something (Chloe Elisabeth, University of Wisconsin-Milwaukee)

 Bedtime for Reagan! (Justin Wood and Jack Amadon, Keene State College)

 FIN (Bobby Austin, Franklin and Marshall College)

 Pseudostar (Enza Marcy, Virginia Commonwealth University School of the Arts)

 a peculiar tenderness (isabella delcastillo, University of Wisconsin-Milwaukee)

 Creation (Jedi Kang, University at Buffalo)

2020 SEFF Binghamton 
SEFF Binghamton 2020 took place in streaming format via Facebook Live on the night of June 26, 2020. The former program "Reel Serene" streamed on 7:00 PM EDT, and the latter "A peek into the earthly" on 9:00 PM. The curators were David Galstyan, Xueqi Qiu, Kio Yoshinaga, and Xinyi Zheng; the festival coordinator was Dana Tyner, and the graphic designer was Jules Mignanelli. 

"Reel Serene"

Total Running Time: 75.5 min.

 Her Contour (Ke Huang, 5 min., Franklin and Marshall College)

 In the Days Before (Liam James Fitch, 3 min., Binghamton University)

 Inherited Labor (Cecilia Kim, 17.5 min., Virginia Commonwealth University)

 Summer (Mary Wheeler, 3 min., Ohio State University)

 Suburban Versions (Stephen Wardell, 7.5 min., University of Iowa)

 What You Left Behind (Jayce Kolinski, 18.5 min., University of Wisconsin-Milwaukee)

 300 E (Daniel Wroblewski, 3 min., University of Wisconsin-Milwaukee)

 For No One (Karis Jones, 5 min., University at Buffalo)

 Slight Heat (Christy Yitong He, 2.5 min., California Institute of the Arts)

 Vestige (Mireille Heidbreder, 10.5 min., Virginia Commonwealth University School of the Arts)

"A peek into the earthly"

Total Running Time: 74.5 min.

 Pardon My French (Liz Sunday, 2 min., University of Wisconsin-Milwaukee)

 Hopper: Act I: Under the Big Top (Lorena Hinojosa, 3.5 min., University of Illinois at Chicago)

 Moonroof (Liza Hazelwood, 3 min., Virginia Commonwealth University)

 Artemis Rising (Ke Huang, 3.5 min., Franklin and Marshall College)

 Nuclear Family (Brittaney Skavla, 5 min., Binghamton University)

 Out the Window, Out the Window (Jacob Gyory, 6.5 min., Binghamton University)

 okay. (Michaela Thomas, 3 min., Franklin and Marshall College)

 Something Fishy (John Amadon, 6.5 min., Keene State College)

 Life Indoors (Jayce Kolinski, 10.5 min., University of Wisconsin-Milwaukee)

 Alejandro & Miguel (Joie Estrella Horwitz, 9 min., California Institute of the Arts)

 Work Today! (William Podolny, 3 min., Binghamton University)

 Don’t Worry (Brandon Castillo, 4 min., University of Boulder Colorado)

 Deleted Icons (Tanamá Rivera Vargas, 15 min., University of Illinois at Chicago)

2019 SEFF Binghamton 
The 2019 SEFF Binghamton was held on November 22 and 23, 2019 in Downtown Binghamton, NY and Binghamton University respectively. The first night of the festival took place on Friday, November 22 at The Bundy Museum-Annex Theater in downtown Binghamton. The second day was held at Binghamton University's Lecture Hall 6. Four programs of short experimental films by students across the United States were screened. In this year, the award for the Best Experimental Film was awarded to Jona Gerlach for his film "The Pit". The second place prize winner was Sophia Theodore-Pierce for her film "One Off". Honorable mentions were given to Jack Lyons for his film "How to Choose a Name When Yours is Taken" and Callan Thomas for his film "Easy Living". This year's Guest Juror was Vincent Grenier.

2019 SEFF Binghamton Programs

Turbulent--Curated by Michael Agliata

TRT: 52 min

 The 8ugs R 7ruit (Daniel Criblez, University of New Haven, 6:09, video)

 TellTale (Fu Yang, Academy of Art University, 3:09, video)

 Cut (Justin Wood, Keene State College, 6:00, video)

 Bottom Line or Meditation for the Proletariat (Trisha Young, U of Wisconsin MIlwaukee, 2:30, video)

 The Pit (Jona Gerlach, University of Colorado Boulder, 11:00, video)

 Madam Stramoni’s Burlesque Show (Chris Shadbolt, SUNY Purchase, 10:00, video)

 Natural Disaster (Emily Priddy, U of Wisconsin MIlwaukee, 4:03, video)

 sunday night (Killian Venman, NYU, 3:46, video)

 It’s Only Us (Nick Roetemeyer, Evergreen State College, 5:07, video)

Wanna Go For a Trip?--Curated by Jolie Ramirez

TRT: 53 min

 FIXTURES (Jake Shereck, Binghamton, 2:40, video)

 Optic Nerve (Peter Hartsock, U Syracuse, 15:00, video)

 Sanative Magic (Gyasi Mitchell, High School in Baltimore, 4:45, video)

 A New Dawn For America (Jingjing Lin, SVA, 7:25, video)

 Soup Time (Joshua Fand, SUNY Alfred, 00:14, animation)

 Sunrise to Sunset (Jayce Kolinski, U Wisconsin Milwaukee, 3:23, video)

 Easy Living (Callan Thomas, U Wisconsin Milwaukee, 13:38, video)

 A Fixed Answer (Britany Gunderson, U Wisconsin Milwaukee, 3:16, video)

Easy Freedom--Curated by Yifan Shi

TRT: 56 min

 DRIFTLESS (Jonah Primiano, CalArts, 6:07, video)

 Corona (Alex Broadwell, CalArts, 1:24, video)

 Ceaseless Vanishing (Mykhailo Bogdanov, DePaul U, 3:37, video)

 This Machine Destroys Everything (Nishat Hossain, 1:50, U Denver, video)

 everybody wants something (Liam Fitch, Binghamton, 5:00, 8mm)

 Of Concrete and Carbon (Emily Priddy, 5:02, U Wisconsin Milwaukee, video)

 finds the double ententre in things (Julian Dime, 16:00, Bard College, video)

 One Off (Sofia Theodore-Pierce, U Wisconsin Milwaukee, 13:00, video)

Vicissitudes--Curated by Ghryffin Reece-Evans

TRT: 46 min

 Something Reflective of the Human Condition (Nate Platzner, Binghamton, 5:00, super 8)

 Angles (Robyn Erlich, UWM, 4:46, video)

 Ante Meridiem (Kyle Odefey, Zachary Howatt, Minnesota State, 2:00, video)

 We Build Our own Ziggurats (Kyle Ryan, UWM, 3:07, video)

 In Collaboration (Emily Van Loan, U Colorado Boulder, 5:43, video)

 Recreating Badass (Alyssa Borkowski, UWM, 6:00, video)

 Meat Love (Naomi Crohn, Pratt, 3:09, video)

 How To Choose a Name When Yours is Taken (Jack Lyons, Binghamton, 15:56, video)

2018 SEFF Binghamton 

2018 SEFF Binghamton Programs

Evergreen

TRT: 58 min

 Cracked Hands (Hogan Seidel, 8 min, 2018, Emersen College)
 
 Service Industry (Annette Daniels Taylor, 6 min, 2017, University at Buffalo)
 
 Diana (Traci Hercher, 8 min, 2018, University of Iowa)
 
 parquet (William Jones and Gabriel Yohe, 10 min, 2018, University of Virginia)
 
 The Problem That Has No Name (Hannah Bonner, 7 min, 2017, University of Iowa)
 
 Interview with Jesus (Corrine James, 4 min, 2018, University of Virginia)
 
 Last Words [Sic] (Hugo Ljungbäck, 6 min, 2017, University of Wisconsin-Milwaukee)
 
 Black Lives Matter (Rosella Joseph, 9 min, 2018, University of Wisconsin-Milwaukee)
 
 
Layer Cake

TRT: 70 min

 Space Defined (Britany Gunderson, 5 min, 2017, University of Wisconsin-Milwaukee)
 
 Teardown (Kate E. Hinshaw, 4.5 min, 2018, University of Colorado Boulder)
 
 very serious (Evan Porter Hurlburt, 8 min, 2018, University at Buffalo)
 
 Profile of Chosen Beings (Graham Hartlaub, 4.5 min, 2018, University of Wisconsin-Milwaukee)
 
 What We Say In Cars pt. I (Lorenzo Rossi, 10 min, 2017, Emerson College)
 
 Scoby Dam Park (David Jeff, 4 min, 2018, University at Buffalo)
 
 Strangers in Familiar Places (Lee Terwilliger, 4 min, 2018, University at Buffalo)
 
 Fear of Drowning (Dakota Nanton, 9 min, 2018, University of Colorado Boulder)
 
 Regenmusik (Auden Lincoln-Vogel and Annelyse Gelman, 5 min, 2018, University of Iowa)
 
 The Silo's Sway (Petar Odazhiev, 3 min, 2018, University at Buffalo)
 
 Blue Film (Azalia Muchransyah, 4 min, 2017, University at Buffalo)
 
 Spooky Action at a Distance (Philip Rabalais, 9 min, 2017, University of Iowa)

2017 SEFF Binghamton 

2017 SEFF Binghamton Programs

Retrograded --Curated by Howard Lauretti

TRT: 50.5 min

 Afloat (Devon Narine-Singh, 6.5 min, 2017, SUNY Purchase)
 
 Happy Saturday (Jayce Kolinski, 3.5 min, 2017, University of Wisconsin Milwaukee)
 
 Heaven Vol. 1 (Aaron Longroia, 6 min, 2017, University of Iowa)
 
 The Hidden Injuries of Dreams (Giacomo Vagni, 6 min, 2017, Cornell University)
 
 Film About Nostalgia (Will Barker, 4.5 min, 2017, Virginia Commonwealth University)
 
 Clock Struck Goodbye (Nate Kouri, Andrew Jones, 4 min, 2017, University of Iowa)
 
 The Mime (Ari Gregg and Justin Murray, 3.5 min, 2017, Keene State College)
 
 Obituaries (Nicholas Skopinski, 4.5 min, 2017, SUNY Fredonia)
 
 A New Hero (Ailis Clyne, 4 min, 2016, Cornell University)
 
 Please Don’t Put me in a Box (Tyler Williams, 4 min, 2017, University of Wisconsin Milwaukee) 
 
 No Gods No Managers (Dan Stewart, 5 min, 2016, University of Kansas)
 

Journey Out of Flatland --Curated by Riley Greenspan

TRT: 50 min

 Voratus (Brendan Lynch, 3 min, 2016, Fredonia State University)
 
 No Water in the Desert (Lydia Simone Wagoner, 2 min, 2017, California College of the Arts)
 
 ∀ Humans ∃ Creativity (Christopher Woloshyn, 3 min, 2017, Binghamton University)
 
 Hear Colors (Yuntian Zang, 2 min, 2017, Ohio State University)
 
 Red (Farah M. Boules, 3 min, 2017, University of Iowa)
 
 Would (Joshua Fand, 2.5 min, 2016, Alfred State College)
 
 In the Magical Forest of Wonder (Jayce Kolinski, 5.5 min, 2017, University of Wisconsin Milwaukee)
 
 Birdlime Ballet (Nate Kouri, 6 min, 2017, University of Iowa)
 
 KV62 (Kyle Ryan, 3 min, 2017, University of Wisconsin Milwaukee)
 
 Ballooned (Hanna Pratt, 3.5 min, 2017, California College of the Arts)
 
 Oh, Ophelia (Dakota Nanton, 3.5 min, 2016, University of Colorado Boulder)
 
 You’re Not Funny (Dan Stewart, 9 min, 2016, University of Kansas)
 
 Touch (Gabriella Cisneros, 4 min, 2017, University of Wisconsin Milwaukee)
 

One Last Peak Before You Go  --Curated by Sarah Simone

TRT: 46 min

 Identity (Dylan Briese, 1 min, 2016, University of North Carolina at Wilmington) 
 
 A Denial (Natasha Woods, 4.5 min, 2017, University of Wisconsin Milwaukee) 
 
 East South West & North (Hong Huo, 6.5 min, 2017, Virginia Commonwealth University)
 
 Shape (Kaylyn Kluck, 2 min, 2016, University of Iowa)  
 
 Sunset Song (Grace Mitchell, 4 min, 2017, University of Wisconsin Milwaukee) 
 
  (Emily Van Loan, 8 min, 2017, Binghamton University) 
 
 I Dreamt I Was A Butterfly (Leigh Barron, 4.5 min, 2016, Keene State College)
 
 Negative Thoughts (Cherlyn Hsing-Hsin Liu, 4 min, 2017, California Institute of the Arts) 
 
 Only chance (Sue June, 2 min, 2017, Virginia Commonwealth University)
 
 The children are dancing… (Jeremy M. Lange, 5.5 min, 2017, Duke University) 
 
 A Homely Kind of Magic (Hannah Pratt, 4 min, 2017 California College of the Arts)

2016 SEFF Binghamton 
The 2016 SEFF Binghamton was held on December 2 and 3, 2016 in Downtown Binghamton, NY and Binghamton University respectively. The first night of the festival took place on Friday, December 2 at Art Mission & Theater in downtown Binghamton and was also a part of the City of Binghamton's monthly First Friday Art Walk. The second day was held at Binghamton University's Union Underground Cafe. Four programs of short experimental films by students across the United States were screened. In this year, the Special Jury Award for the Best Experimental Film was awarded to Hsuan-Kuang Hsien for her film "The Islands". This year's Guest Juror was Susana Barriga.

Pillow Talk for the Soul--Curated by Emily Van Loan
Top Thrill (Grace Mitchell, 7 min, University of Wisconsin, Milwaukee)
Ballad in 16mm (Elaine Pak, 2 min 47 s, Duke University)
The Islands (Hsuan-Kuang Hsien, 10 min, CalArts)
Just Some Thoughts (Abbey Sacks, 1.5 min, CalArts)
Emerald Ice (Jesseca Simmons, 16 min, Northwestern University)
De/fining Lines (Reaa Puri, 6 min, University of California, Berkeley)
My Life In Google (Adam Sekuler, 24 min, University of Colorado, Boulder)

The Leaving and The Left--Curated by Shuai Wang
Flaws (Josh Shaffner, color, sound, 02:36min, 2016, California Institute of the Arts)
Cycle/Recycled (Seiichiro Okuma, color, sound, 08:52min, 2016, Keene State College)
The Persistence of Memory (Leanna Kaiser, black and white and color, sound, 16mm, 01:24min, 2015, California Institute of the Arts)
A Ghost in his Shadow (Mike Rice, color, sound, 10:17min, 2015, California Institute of the Arts)
Fault Lines (Mandy Wong, color, sound, 03:12min, 2016, Rhode Island School of Design)
Falling (Chris Wittum, color, silent, 03:21, 2015, Ohio State University)
Zero Sum (Rebecca Shenfeld, color, sound, 06:02min, 2015, Rhode Island School of Design)
why to hook hurt ends (Emily M Van Loan, black and white, silent, 01:20min, 2016, Binghamton University)
Songbird (Courtney Kuether, color, sound, 02:17min, 2016, Columbus College of Art and Design)
The Road to Nowhere (Jack Turpin, color, sound, 08:31min, California Institute of the Arts)

Secret of Red Roses--Curated by Kenny Kim
Glint Of (Caroline Friend, Color, Sound 1min 46s USC, 2016)
Beat the City (Claudinho Andres, Color Sound, 3min 42s, NY Film Academy, 2016)
Stagnant (Daniel Mendelson, B&W and Color, Sound, 2min 17s, Emerson College, 2016)
Ambersona (Nicholas Swanton, Color, Sound, 5min 41s, Columbia College Chicago, 2016)
Spanish Sahara (Peiqi Peng, B&W and Color, Silent, 2min 14s, Emerson College, 2016)
18 memories of two people (Daniel Murphy, Color, Sound, 8min 28s, Calarts, 2016)
Ponchartrain (Adam Sekuler, Color, Sound, 4min 8s, University of Colorado, 2016)
Pink (Mochelle Chen, Color, Sound, 5min 40s, Virginia Commonwealth University, 2016)
Alphabet_1 (Jordan Gozinsky, B&W and Color, Sound, 16min 7s, Binghamton University 2016)
Trace and Remembrance (Carl Patow, Color, Sound, 2min 41s, Virginia Commonwealth University, 2016)
AEON (Derek O’Dell, Color, Sound, 3min 55s, Chapman University, 2016)

From Seed to Soil--Curated by Mick Thomas
The Delirium of Negation (A.E. Dailey, Color, Silent, 1m 8s, 2016, Visual Studies Workshop)
Tomato (Caitlin Craggs, Color, Sound, 2m 42s, 2015, CalArts)
Our Turn (Martiros Vartanov, B&W, Sound, 3m, 2015, UCLA)
Surface (Cami Dominguez, B&W, 2m 38s, 2016, Amherst College)
Chirps – (Çagil Harmandar, Color, Sound, 2m 52s, 2016, School of Museum of Fine Arts)
Desire (Greg Maziuk, B&W, Silent, 4m 47s, 2016, NYU)
Pavilion (Adam Sekuler, Color, Sound, 2m 37s, 2015, Colorado-Boulder)
Glass (Anna Cassady, Color, Sound, 3m 26s, 2015, Binghamton University)
Thinking Things Over (Natasha Woods, B&W, Sound, 3m 22s, 2016, UW-M)
Witchy Shit (Leanna Kaiser, Color, Sound, 47s, 2016, CalArts)
Water Music Song (Hong Huo, Color, Sound, 2m 47s, 2016, VCU)
From the Dizziness of Freedom: The Philosophy Vessel (Melissa Ferrari, Color, Sound, 7m 14s, 2016, School of the Museum of Fine Arts)
Adam (Evelyn Jane Ross, Color, Sound, 2m 27s, 2016, RISD)
Mother (A.E. Dailey, B&W, Silent, 1m 58s, 2016, Visual Studies Workshop)
sleep until It hurts (Jacob Greenberg, Color, Sound, 5m 47s, 2016, Amherst College)
LUNA E SANTUR (Joshua Gen Solondz, Color, Sound, 10m 36s, 2016, CalArts)

2015 SEFF Binghamton 
2015 SEFF Binghamton took place on December 5 and 6 in Binghamton, New York. For the third time in festival history, a special Jury Award was given to Sky Hopinka's film "Jáaji Approx". A Special mention was given to "VIVEROS" by Manuela De Laborde. The Juror was Daïchi Saïto, the 2015 artist-in-residence at Binghamton University.

Grace in the Chaos--Curated by Grant Herson
Shift (Mitchell Craft, 3 min, 2015, Virginia Commonwealth University)
Circle (Yayue Ding, 3 min, 2015, Emerson College)
Wax Cloud (John McElfresh, 5.5 min, 2015, Emerson College)
Cute As A Button (Marta Finkelstein, 5 min, 2015, Virginia Commonwealth University)
Theia (Alex Cunningham, 9 min, 2015, Duke University)
Adele Performing "Someone Like You" LIVE in Her Home (Samuel Bowman, 6 min, 2015, Virginia Commonwealth University)
You Don’t Own Me (Christina C Nguyen, 6.5 min, 2014, California Institute of the Arts)
Plastic (Abbey Sacks, 2 min, 2015, California Institute of the Arts)
The Boxer (Zachary Krueger, 4 min, 2015, University of Wisconsin-Milwaukee)
ODE (Sam Kirchoff, 4 min, 2014, University of Wisconsin-Milwaukee)
Oh… (Danyu Wang, 3 min, 2015 Emerson College)
Antatomical Gifts (Michaela O'Brien, 6 min, 2015, Duke University)
twenty-five (Alex Cunningham, 3min, 2015, Duke University)
TRT: 60 min

Digital eMotion--Curated by Nicholas Michalski
Improv (Yulia Gilichinskaya, 14 min, 2014, SUNY Buffalo)
Untitled (Matt Trotz, 3 min, 2015, University of Illinois at Chicago)
On the Out (Jasmine Armstrong, 10.5, 2015, Syracuse University)
A Child's Guide (Gabriella Cisneros, 3.5 min, 2015, University of Wisconsin - Milwaukee)
Josh the Goldfish (Samuel Bowman, 2 min, 2014, Virginia Commonwealth University)
Dog Sweater (Kyla Jo Tighe, 2 min, 2015, Ball State University)
a person, cleaning (Jack McElfresh, 10 min, 2015, Emerson College)
A Long Duck That Is Filled With String So As To Use For Something Like Knots (Daniel Black, 13 min, 2015, University of Wisconsin - Milwaukee)
TRT: 59 min

A Journey Through Time and Space--Curated by Fan Pan
Window (Mitchell Craft, 1 min, 2015, Virginia Commonwealth University)
Atmos Hloubětín (Terry Jones, Govind Deecee, Akshay Raheja, 2.5 min, 2015, Syracuse University)
Picture Start (Hannah Raye White, 7 min, 2014, University of Wisconsin - Milwaukee)
after/all (Yixu Chen, 11 min, 2014, Franklin & Marshall College)
Better Late (Gabby Follett, 2.5 min, 2015, Emerson College)
Tokyo Minor (Kino Cheng, 10 min, 2015, Emerson College)
Jaaji Approx (Sky Hopinka, 8 min, 2015, University of Wisconsin Milwaukee)
TRT: 42 min

Memory: Touching Upon My Past--Curated by Ella YeRang Kang
Scarlett (Terry Jones, Govind Deecee, Erin Perkins, 7 min, 2014, Syracuse University)
Nice & Good (Joana Stillwell, 4 min, 2015, Virginia Commonwealth University)
Musical Note (Yayue Ding, 3 min, 2015, Emerson College)
VIVEROS (Manuela de laborde, 7 min, 2014, California Institute of the Arts)
Coffee Time (Minjung Kim, 7 min, 2014, California Institute of the Arts)
Mother's Day Alternative (Anna Kuo, 2 min, 2015, Emerson College)
Untitled (Horse) (Rajee Samarasinghe, 4 min, 2014, California Institute of the Arts)
Autumn (Alexander Rudolph, 3 min, 2015, University of Denver)
suite of (3) poems (SNEAL, 3 min, 2015, California Institute of the Arts)
Spectral Presence (Sierra Pall, 11min, 2015, California Institute of the Arts)
Water: Memories (Gabriella Cisneros, 5 min, 2015, University of Wisconsin Milwaukee)
Gaumukh (Alex Cunningham, 6 min, 2015, Duke University)
TRT: 62 min

2014 SEFF Binghamton 
2014 SEFF Binghamton took place on December 4 and 5 in Binghamton, New York. For the second time in festival history, a special Jury Award was honored to a competing filmmaker by Binghamton University artist-in-residence Peter Bo Rappmund. The winner of the 2014 Special Jury Award was Azadeh Navai for her film "Friday Mosque". Special mentions include "Watching It" by Max Bayarsky, "Robo Wanglin Episode 1 & 2" by Anne Forrester and "Bridge" by Jesse Kreuzer.

Escape--Curated by Daniel Hong
Watching it (Max Bayarsky, 11 mins, Sound, 2014, SUNY Purchase)
Keep Telling Yourself Exactly What You Want To Hear (Dan Martens, 7.5 mins, Sound, 2013, Ball State University)
 (Chris Alsen, Doug Benton, Zach Ezickson, 2 mins, Sound, 2014, Franklin & Marshall College)
Immobile (Garrick Givens, 6 mins, Sound, 2014, Binghamton University)
Loqui (William Burris, 7.5 mins, Sound, 2014, Pratt Institute) 
Sisyphus_404 (Matt Klein, 9 mins, Sound, 2013, Massachusetts College of Art and Design)
My Body (Taylor Edelle Stuart, 1.5 mins, Sound, 2014, University of Iowa)
Dissociative (Shannon Roulet, 2.5 mins, Sound, 2014, *School Unknown)
PENTIMENTI (Kaitlin Gleason, 2 mins, Sound, 2014, Bard College)
Robo Wanglin Episode 2 (Anne Forrester, 1.5 mins, Sound, 2014,Virginia Commonwealth University)
“Flat circle” (Benjamin Roggie, 4.5 mins, Sound, 2014, Fredonia State University of New York)
Bridge (Jesse Kreuzer, 9.5 mins, Sound, 2014, Cornell University)
Tumbleweed (Elliot Worth, 3 mins, Sound, 2013, Rhode Island School of Design)

Prism--Curated by Ken Omiya
Improvisation no. 1 (Jhon McElfresh, 5 mins, Sound, 2014, Emerson College)
A Symphoniae Metropolis (Matt Klein, 6.5 mins, Sound, 2013, Franklin & Marshall College)
Wax (Jason Chadwick, 3 mins, Sound, 2013, Fredonia University) 
The Reaction of Containment (Kayla Batson, 2.5 mins, Sound, 2013, SUNY Fredonia)
Splatter (Rebecca Rossman, 5 mins, Sound, 2014, Binghamton University)
Camera Body (Esther Dionisio, 1.5 mins, Sound, 2014, Binghamton University)
Sadist (Ken Omiya, 5 mins, Sound, 2014, Binghamton University)
Heaven (Samuel Bowman, 4.5 mins, Sound, 2014, Virginia Commonwealth University)
Robo Wanglin (Anne Forrester, 1 min, Sound, 2014, Virginia Commonwealth University)
Internal Resonance (Anna Chan, 3.5 mins, Sound, 2014, Binghamton University)
Arsenic (Dimitri Kapetan & Hayden Chisholm, 4 mins, Sound, 2014, University of Denver)
Sahbjectivity (Gabi Guterson, 3 mins, Sound, 2014, Binghamton University)
The Green Moth (Alexander Leiss, 3 mins, Sound, 2014, Binghamton University)
Meteor Child (Alec Iselin, 10.5 mins, Sound, 2014, Pratt Institute)

The World Around Us--Curated by Anna Cassady
Disconnected (David Karp, 6.5 mins, Sound, 2014, Cornell University)
Mien (Laszlo Bolender, 3 mins, Sound, 2014, University of California, Berkeley)
City Whispers (Paul Orr, 4 mins, Sound, 2014, Keene State College)
a TRIP: (Vukica Lungulov-Klotz, 4.5 mins, Mono, 2014, SUNY Purchase College)
The Bags, Probably 1971 (Yates, 5 mins, Sound, 2013, University of Iowa)
Eyes/Desires (Josh Thorud, 6 mins, Sound, 2014, Virginia Commonwealth University)
Niche (Benjamin Searle, 3.5 mins, Sound, 2013, SUNY Fredonia)
Freeze (Megan Lewandowski, 2.5 mins, Sound, 2013, SUNY Fredonia)
Friday Mosque (Azadeh Navai, 8 mins, Sound, 2014, CalArts)
The Congregates (Patrick Kirkley, 9 mins, Sound, 2014, University of Montana)
2.866.642 Ways to Create Space (Sofia Caetano, 5 mins, Sound, 2014, Emerson College)

Defunct Aesthetics --Curated by Jon Su
Agate (Alexander Hager, 2.5 mins, sound, 2014, California Institute of the Art)
Static Shift (Maritza Martinez, 2.5 mins, Silent, 2013, University of Illinois at Chicago)
Sill (Laszlo Bolender, 4 mins, Sound, 2014, University of California, Berkeley)
Focusing (Anna Swanson 5.5 mins, Sound, 2014, University of Iowa)
Sense of place (Todd Midler, 4.5 mins, Sound, 2014, Pratt Institute)
Tao (Jaryd Petroski, 3 mins, Sound, 2013, SUNY, Fredonia) 
Life Dirt (Alanna Morton, 11 mins, Mono, 2014, SUNY, Purchase)
Look Up (Lingxiang Wu, 4 mins, Sound, 2014, University of Buffalo)
Understanding a Spider's Web (Kayla Batson, 3 mins, Sound, 2013, SUNY, Fredonia)
Toro (Lynn Kim, 3.5 mins, Sound, 2014, Rhode Island School of Design)
Microcosmos (Benjamin Searle, 3 mins, Sound, 2013, SUNY, Fredonia) 
If We Were Dust (Amanda Knigga and Melissa Joy Livermore, 5 mins, Sound, 2013, Ball State University)
Carbon Black (Rhiannon Vercant, 6.5 mins, Sound, 2013, SUNY, Fredonia)

2013 SEFF Binghamton 
2013 SEFF Binghamton took place on December 6 and 7 in Binghamton, New York. For the first time in festival history, a special Jury Award was honored to a competing filmmaker by Binghamton University artist-in-residence Jennifer Lauren Smith. The winner of the 2013 Special Jury Award was Anna Hogg for her film "One Truth".

Nostalgic Anagnorisis--Curated by Haley Landers
Pencil Pusher (Thomas Frew, 1.5 min., digital video, Alfred State College)
Hyperactive (Jennifer Ontiveros, 3.5 min., digital video, Dartmouth College)
Fiji (Keaton Fox, 1.5 min., digital video, Syracuse University)
Snooze (Ryan Pattinson, 3.5 min., digital video, Ball State University)
Teddy Has Made You a Birthday Cake (Luyan Zhang, 2.5 min., digital video, University at Buffalo)
SUPERNYM (Jesse Malmed, 13 min., digital video, University of Illinois at Chicago)
The Good Ones and the Bad Ones (Anna Hogg, 4.5 min., digital video, University of Virginia)
The Present Tense is my Best Defense (D. Jesse Damazo, 1.5 min., digital video, University of Iowa)
One Never Notices What Had Been Done (Melissa Myser, 8 min., digital video, University of Illinois at Chicago)
Over Cream (James Mattise, 10.5 min., digital video, Virginia Commonwealth University)

DREAMS OF DESPAIR--Curated by Jordan Betsch
One Truth (Anna Hogg, 15 min., digital video, University of Virginia)
a filter's dream (Luyan Zhang, 6 min., digital video, University at Buffalo)
Binding (Katarzyna Plazinska, 9 min., digital video, University of Iowa)
Public Transformation (Dan Ketchum, 5.5 min., digital video, University of Denver)
in heaven (Omeed Nabavi, 3.5 min., digital video, University of Maryland Baltimore County)
RGBW (Stephen Quinlan, 16 min., digital video, Massachusetts College of Art and Design)
AZOTH (Ernesto Flores, 15 min., digital video, Kansas City Art Institute)

INTERIM IDENTITY--Curated by Garrick Givens
i, eye (Keaton Fox, 2.5 min., digital video, Syracuse University)
Portrait of a Man Cleaning Up (Anna Hogg, 1.5 min., digital video, University of Virginia)
Ten Notes on a Summer's Day (Mike Stoltz, 4.5 min., digital video, California Institute of the Arts)
Centralia (Currie Lee, 13 min., digital video, Maryland Institute College of Art)
This is (not) YATES (Joshua Yates, 3 min., digital video, University of Iowa)
Talking Me (Metrah Pashaee, 4 min., digital video, University of Iowa)
Symbol (Coy Yuan, 2min., digital video, Ball State University)
WREADING (Jesse Malmed, 18 min., digital video, University of Illinois at Chicago)
Earthly Traces (Anastasia Dubrovina, 5 min., digital video, Keene State College)
Empire State (Terry Jones and Govind Deecee, 5 min., digital video, Syracuse University)
Willi (Walfgang Hastert, 1.5 min., digital video, Duke University)

REACT⚠ON--Curated by Angelica Rodriguez Santos
another day in pittsburgh/the final separation (Jesslyn Boisclair, 3.5 min., digital video, Massachusetts College of Art and Design)
‘s afternoon tea (Luyan Zhang, 6 min., 16mm, University at Buffalo)
Video Ashes (Allie Lee, 2 min., digital video, Southern Illinois University Carbondale)
Slideshow (Thomas Reynolds, 2.5 min., digital video, Keene State College)
A Listening Air (Matt Shaw, 7 min., digital video, University of Illinois at Chicago)
GOTH MOVIE (CHEMIROCHA) (Jesse Malmed, 2.5 min., digital video, University of Illinois at Chicago)
aperture (Kioto Aoki, 9 min., 16mm, The School of The Art Institute of Chicago)
Light Rhythm #1-3 (Youjin Moon, 5 min., digital video, Massachusetts College of Art and Design)
Movements (James Mattise, 3 min., digital video, Virginia Commonwealth University)
The Further He Strays (Martin Hernandez Rosas, 8 min., digital video, University of Illinois at Chicago)
Underneath (Sienna Pinney, 4.5 min., digital video, University of Denver)
Clinging and Grasping (Brenda L. Burmeister, 10 min., digital video, Duke University)

2012 SEFF Binghamton 
The 2012 SEFF Binghamton was held on December 7 and 8, 2012 in Downtown Binghamton, NY and Binghamton University respectively. The first night of the festival, Friday, December 8, was a part of the City of Binghamton's monthly First Friday Art Walk, with the first program of the festival screened at the Art Mission & Theater in downtown Binghamton. Four programs of short, student-made experimental films were screened at 2012 SEFF Binghamton. While none of the featured films were made by Binghamton University students, each program was curated by a Binghamton student.

Explorers of the Established -- Currated by Ryan Kimiecik
IBM 7094 (Laura Marie Judge, 2.5 min., Video, Keene State College)
Ean's Day ( Ben Crouse & Jacob Sluka, 3.5 min., Video, California Institute of the Arts)
Treeman (Claire Ying-Chin Wang, 16.5 min., Video, Syracuse University)
Symphony (Nicholas Langley, 5.5 min., Video, University of Colorado at Boulder)
Las Delicias (Ford Bostwick & Alexander Svoboda, 7.5 min., Video, Syracuse University)
Sphinx: Hall of Records (Fred Frederiksen, 19.5 min., Video, University of Illinois at Chicago)
A B GG (D. Jesse Damazo & Sinah Ober, 6 min., Video, University of Iowa)
 (Dylan Lowry, 20 min., Video, Ithaca College)

Tendencies of Existence--Currated by Brittany Cardamone
Time (Amanda Knigga, 4 min., Video, Ball State University)
Irretrievable Illumination (Keaton Fox, 2.5 min., Video, Syracuse University)
Becoming (Alejandro Parra, 4 min., Video, University of California, San Diego)
Naturalized (Wolfgang Hastert, 3.5 min., Video, Duke University)
A Robin's Nest (Keaton Fox, 2 min., Video, Syracuse University)
<Ancient> Knowledge to the Future (Terry Jones, 4 min., Video, Syracuse University)
Woman I (Anna Hogg, 2 min., Video, University of Virginia)
Mary & Pete, from the “living with” Series (Brenda L. Burmeister, 4 min., Video, Duke University)
Ruby (Braxton Hood, 3.5 min., Video, Duke University)
Grandma (Andrew Mui, 9 min., HD Video, Massachusetts College of Art)
Tropic of Cancer (A. Currie Lee, 6 min., Video, Maryland Institute College of Art)
Eulogy (Susanna Kim, 9.5 min., Video, Syracuse University)
il Volo dell'angelo (Caterina Masia, 4.5 min., Video, Keene State College)
Replacement (Katarzyna Plazinska, 4 min., HD Video, University of Iowa)

Reel Feelings--Curated by Dean Tepper
Untitled #2 (Brendan Field, 3.5 min., 16mm, Emerson College)
Rain (Keaton Fox, 4 min., Video, Syracuse University)
Moth in a Corner (Raina Kim, 6.5 min., Video, California Institute of the Arts)
The Product of my Sadness (Corrinne LeNeave, 2.5 min., Video, Ball State University)
Like a Jellyfish in January (Keaton Fox, 4 min., Video, Syracuse University)
A Table Setting (Corrinne LeNeave, 3 min., Video, Ball State University)
The Sheer Red Screen (Anna Hogg, 9 min., Video, University of Virginia)
Derived from Mud (Niki Murphy, 6 min., Video, Maryland Institute College of Art)
Touch (Pinwen Lien, 2 min., Video, Emerson College)
Production (Tian Guan, 3 min., Video, Syracuse University)
I see you (Susanna Kim, 5.5 min., Video, Syracuse University)
It’s War (Samantha Stephan, 4 min., Video, University of Iowa)
Two Voicemails on a Sunday (Keaton Fox, 3 min., Video, Syracuse University)

Debunking Depth--Curated by Carl Schrecongost
Gridlock (Nook Harquail, Alison Helzer, Ryan Hueston, Nick O’Leary, Alex Stockton, & Victoria Tucker, 2.5 min., 16mm, Dartmouth College)
Static Revelations (Robin Huey, 1.5 min., Video, University of California, San Diego)
Commuting to Luna (Nook Harquail, 3.5 min., Video, Dartmouth College)
Gentlemen Prefer Glitch (Holly Lay, 4 min., Video, Ball State University)
Memory (Alison Helzer, 3 min., Video, Dartmouth College)
Through a Tunnel (Weigang Song, 4.5 min., Video, Syracuse University)
Acknowledge the Edge (Rebeccah Pope, 1.5 min., Video, Syracuse University)
Down on the Ground (Mike Stoltz, 1 min., 16mm, California Institute of the Arts)
the not so ongoing smoke (Jolene Mok, 8 min., Video, Duke University)
Girl.Tree.Apple.Fly (Rebeccah Pope, 5 min., Video, Syracuse University)
A tender case #1 (Laura Marie Judge, 5 min., Video, Keene State College)
Somnambulist (Raina Kim, 8.5 min., Video, California Institute of the Arts)

2011 SEFF Binghamton
2011 SEFF Binghamton was held the weekend of December 2 and 3. The first night of the festival, Friday, December 2, was a part of the City of Binghamton's monthly First Friday Art Walk, with the first program of the festival screened at the Know Theatre in downtown Binghamton.

Four programs of short, student-made experimental films were screened at 2011 SEFF Binghamton. While none of the featured films were made by Binghamton University students, each program was curated by a Binghamton student.

Alien Movements: A Transformation Occurs -- Curated by Julia Jin
 Fountain by Elizabeth Webb, University of Virginia
 Fluid Movement by Erika Sofia Murillo, Dartmouth College
 Tempered Unyoung by Lindsay Taylor Jackson, Keene State College
 Transience by Brian Murphy, Visual Studies Workshop
 La Tension by Caterina Masia, Keene State College
 Fourth World by LJ Frezza, Emerson College
 Escape by Evan Paschke, Syracuse University
 Shape by Eusong Lee, California Institute of Arts
 Melt in the Shade by Kyoungju Kim, Syracuse University
 Reservoir by Takahiro Suzuki, University of Virginia
 Tebbet by Deniz Tortum, Bard College
 Subdued Glow by Antonio Vargas, University of Wisconsin- Milwaukee
 Leafless by Nazli Dinçel, San Francisco Art Institute

Our Time -- Curated by Chauna D’Angelo
 Ballet for Tape Music by T. Kane Stanton, Massachusetts College of Art and Design
 Remastered by Bena Dam, University of Virginia
 A London Segment by Dylan Lowry, Ithaca College
 North South by Max Weinman, Bard College
 Pleasure Girl by Vashti Harrison, California Institute of the Arts
 Light Escapes Through the Intervals by Naoko Tasaka, California Institute of Arts
 Light Performances #1 by Dillon Buss, Massachusetts College of Art and Design
 Of Light in Extension, Of Absolute Domain by Jon Perez, University of Central Florida
 Suffering For The Duration by Daniel Watkins, University of Central Florida
 Sheepless by Matthew Whalen, University of Colorado

Visions of Home -- Curated by Matti Bowen
 Motorcity by John Clayton Lee, Maryland Institute College of Art
 Forron by Lindsay Taylor Jackson, Keene State College
 Sponge Candy Story by Yoshimi Mashiro, SUNY Buffalo
 gia đình by Bena Dam, University of Virginia
 Sammy Gurl by Taylor McIntosh, Keene State College
 106 River Road by Josh Weissbach, University of Wisconsin- Milwaukee
 Polymorphia by Ivan Kotevski, City College of New York
 Orion's Belt by Michael Bucuzzo, Massachusetts College of Art and Design
 Pinecastle Rd. by Takahiro Suzuki, University of Virginia
 Portiragnes by Max Weinman, Bard College

The Procession of Textural Abstraction -- Curated by Casey Addason
 Off the Wall by Anna Edwardson, Mark Li, and Erika Murillo, Dartmouth College
 Road Series: 002 by Katie Giguere, Massachusetts College of Art and Design
 Mind Over Matte-r by Anna Edwardson, Tommy Ford, Andy Gay, Max Hammer, Amanda Mata, Annie Munger, Erika Murillo, Annora NG, Troup Wood, Jin Yan, and Allie Young, Dartmouth College
 Calle 27 No. 1016 by Josh Weissbach, University of Wisconsin- Milwaukee
 Addiction Obsession by Catie Eller, San Francisco Art Institute
 Void_Two by Alexander Dupuis, Dartmouth College
 Yes We Can-Certo by Alexander Dupuis, Dartmouth College
 Beauty Evaporates by June Kyu Park, Syracuse University
 Ondine's Curse by Charles Chadwick, San Francisco Art Institute
 115 E. 12th by Maura Johnson, University of Colorado
 I Swim Now by Sarah Biagini, University of Colorado at Boulder
 A Shot of Dark Water by John Clayton Lee, Maryland Institute College of Art

2010 SEFF Binghamton 
2010 SEFF Binghamton consisted of four programs, each of which was curated and presented by Binghamton University students.

Program 1: “Inside & Out” - Curated by Brad Baumes
 “This Kind of Town” by Marcy Saude
 “Manifested Destiny” by David Oonk
 “Reflect” by Tsen-Chu Hsu
 “Nuke Em, Duke” by LJ Frezza
 “Hangman's Tree” by Catie Eller
 “Einsamkeit” by Sang Bum Heo
 “Thembis Diary” by Jisoo Kim
 “One Over Wanderlust” by Brendon Kingsbury
Program 2: “The Ghost Who Walks” - Curated by Mac Cosselman
 “H1CA2” by Seth Fragomen
 “Séance” by Seth Fragomen
 “Smear City” by Greg Hanson
 “Infitar” by Deniz Tortum
 “Transsubstantiation” by Charles Chadwick
 “Debul Wubman” by Lindsay Laven
 “Dance With Me” by Catie Eller
 “Spitting Feathers” by Ian Mcdade
 “Dunya/ Earth” by Deniz Tortum
 “The Eternal Recurrence” by Charles Chadwick
 “Ghost Bird” by Sally Van Meter
Program 3: “ReRun” - Curated by Rory Hayes 
 “(Don't Blink)” by Alexander Cunningham
 “Autopista Del Sur” by Ingrid Echeverry
 “Sample Fiend“ by Elliot Bamberger
 “Kiss Me, I Love You“ by Daniel Bida
 “Window” by Isaac Brooks
 “Tourist” by John Dorn
 “Sofra” by Deniz Tortum
 “Abstract Symphony” by Lorena De Miranda Marques
 “Tetrameter” by Katherine R. Giguere
 “Washes” by Norbert Shieh
 “One man's garbage…Another's treasure” by Lorena De Miranda Marque
Program 4: “New Weird America” - Curated by Shanshan Wang
 “The Donut Tree” by Lorena De Miranda Marques
 “The Vagrant of Ephemera” by Charles Chadwick
 “Old Man, Can I Have Your Daughter” by Melissa Rogers
 “Rebeast” by Sally Van Meter
 “Phases of Sacrifice” by Ivan Kotevski
 “I Want to forget everything; bad that ever happened ever” by Benji Sayed
 “The Barbie Box” by Sally Van Meter
 “Yes, No, Maybe, Go!” by Joe Fuller
 “Wyoming” by Jason Georgiades
 “I am Mrs. Archie Brownlee” by Lindsay Laven
 “The Hills Have Houses” by Bayley Sweitzer

References

External links
Binghamton University Cinema Department
SEFF Binghamton Videos
SEFF Binghamton Website

Film festivals in New York (state)
Binghamton University
Tourist attractions in Binghamton, New York